Puss in Boots: The Last Wish (Original Motion Picture Soundtrack) is the soundtrack to the 2022 film Puss in Boots: The Last Wish, a sequel to Puss in Boots (2011). The album was released on December 16, 2022, by Back Lot Music, and featured musical score composed by Heitor Pereira, who replaced Henry Jackman the composer of the first film. It featured five songs performed by Antonio Banderas, Dan Navarro, Gaby Moreno and Pereira, with his score accompanying the remainder of the album.

Background 
On June 29, 2022, Heitor Pereira was announced as the film's composer, who also began recording the score during that period. He was recommended by the film's executive producer and Illumination CEO Chris Meledandri, whom Pereira had worked in their productions, most notably for the Despicable Me and Minions films and has some experience with DreamWorks with its Madagascar specials like Merry Madagascar and Madly Madgasacar. The album featured five original songs performed by Karol G, Daniel Oviedo, Heitor Pereira, Paul Fisher, Dan Navarro, and Gaby Moreno. Karol G performed the track "La Vida es Una" and co-produced it with longtime producer Ovy on the Drums. The song was released as a single on December 9, 2022. Pereira co-wrote the track "Fearless Hero" performed by Antonio Banderas and co-written by Dan Navarro and Paul Fisher, and "Por Que Te Vas", co-written with and performed by Gaby Moreno. It also featured the cover of The Doors' "This Is The End" performed by Dan Navarro. The film also featured score tracks from Shrek 2 composed by Harry Gregson-Williams, with the tracks "Obliged to Help" and "The End / Happily Ever After". The soundtrack was released on December 16, 2022, five days ahead of the film's release.

Track listing

Additional music 
The track "Narco" by Blasterjaxx and Timmy Trumpet was featured in the second trailer of the film, and Pitbull's "Café Con Leche" was featured in the final trailer. The tracks were used for promotional purposes, and was neither featured in the soundtrack, nor in the film.

Reception 
Odie Henderson of The Boston Globe wrote that "the music has a lovely Spanish flair" and "several catchy ditties by composer Heitor Pereira". Daily Herald called the score as "Ennio Morricone-sque".

Accolades 
Periera's score was listed to be under contention for the 95th Academy Awards under the Best Original Score category, as was the original song: "La Vida es Una" by Karol G and "Fearless Hero", was under contention for the Best Original Song category. Neither of the score and the songs, could get shortlisted. It received a nomination for Best Original Score in an Animated Film at the 13th Hollywood Music in Media Awards, losing to Alexandre Desplat for Pinocchio.

References 

2022 soundtrack albums
Back Lot Music soundtracks
Shrek (franchise)
Heitor Pereira albums